You Cannot Hide (Spanish: No te puedes esconder) is a Spanish-language television series produced by Isla Audiovisual for Telemundo and distributed worldwide by Netflix. The series is filmed in Spain and consists of 10 episodes. It stars Blanca Soto and Eduardo Noriega It premiered on 30 September 2019 and ended on 11 October 2019.

The series became available for streaming on 24 January 2020 on Netflix.

Cast

Main 
 Blanca Soto as Mónica
 Eduardo Noriega as Daniel
 Iván Sánchez as Álex
 Maribel Verdú as Inspectora Urrutia
 Samantha Siqueiros as Natalia
 Peter Vives as Alberto Torres
 Patricia Guirado as Eli
 Jorge Bosch as Velasco
 Pere Ponce as El Comisario
 Juan Caballero as Humberto
 Jordi Planas as Gabriel

Recurring 
 Plutarco Haza as Sánchez
 Adrián Ladrón as Hugo
 Gabriel Porras as De la Cruz
 Julio Casados as Andrés
 Giuseppe Gamba as Diego
 Bárbara Goenaga as Ana
 Eduardo Trucco as Pete
 Oleg Kricunova as Dmitri

Production 
The series was announced in May 2019 during the Telemundo Upfront for the 2019-2020 television season. The filming of the series lasted 12 weeks, with 58 working days. The production had a budget in the Madrid region of 5 million euros and the hiring of 75 people in the artistic team, 103 technicians and several service companies in the city. Among the locations in Madrid city are Plaza de Callao, Gran Vía, Plaza de Santo Domingo, Plaza de Oriente and Puente de Segovia. The series is produced by Isla Audiovisual for Telemundo and Netflix. It is directed by Alejandro Banazzo, Álex de Pablo at the head of the photograph, and Carlos Bodelón as creative director.

Ratings 
  
}}

Episodes

Awards and nominations

References

External links 
 

Spanish-language Netflix original programming
2019 American television series debuts
2019 American television series endings
Television shows filmed in Spain